The 2016–17 Tunisian Cup (Coupe de Tunisie) was the 85th season of the football cup competition of Tunisia.
The competition is organized by the Fédération Tunisienne de Football (FTF) and open to all clubs in Tunisia.

First round

Ligue 2 games
Only Ligue 2 teams compete in this round.

Round of 32

Étoile du Sahel got a bye and qualified to the Round of 16.

Round of 16

Quarter-finals

Semi-finals

Final

See also
2016–17 Tunisian Ligue Professionnelle 1
2016–17 Tunisian Ligue Professionnelle 2
2016–17 Tunisian Ligue Professionnelle 3

References

Tunisian Cup